Kathrin Unterwurzacher (born 5 June 1992) is an Austrian judoka. She competed at the 2016 Summer Olympics in the women's 63 kg event, in which she was eliminated in the repechage by Anicka van Emden of the Netherlands.

References

External links

 
 

1992 births
Living people
Austrian female judoka
Olympic judoka of Austria
Judoka at the 2016 Summer Olympics
Universiade medalists in judo
Universiade bronze medalists for Austria
European Games competitors for Austria
Judoka at the 2015 European Games
Judoka at the 2019 European Games
Medalists at the 2013 Summer Universiade
21st-century Austrian women